King James's School may refer to:

King James's School, Almondbury, a secondary school in Almondbury, West Yorkshire, England
King James's School, Knaresborough, a secondary school in Knaresborough, North Yorkshire, England

See also
King James (disambiguation)